Elm Farm Ollie (known as "Nellie Jay" and post-flight as "Sky Queen") was the first cow to fly in an airplane, doing so on 18 February 1930, as part of the  International Air Exposition in St. Louis, Missouri, United States. On the same trip, which covered 72 miles in a Ford Trimotor airplane from Bismarck, Missouri, to St. Louis, she also became the first cow milked in flight. This was done ostensibly to allow scientists to observe midair effects on animals, as well as for publicity purposes. A St. Louis newspaper trumpeted her mission as being "to blaze a trail for the transportation of livestock by air."

Elm Farm Ollie was reported to have been an unusually productive Guernsey cow, requiring three milkings a day and producing 24 quarts of milk during the flight itself. Wisconsin native Elsworth W. Bunce milked her, becoming the first man to milk a cow mid-flight. Elm Farm Ollie's milk was sealed into paper cartons which were parachuted to spectators below. Charles Lindbergh reportedly received a glass of the milk.

Although Elm Farm Ollie was born and raised in Bismarck, Missouri, it is largely in the dairy state of Wisconsin where her fame has lived on.

References

External links
Tale of a flying cow is milked for all it's worth. South Coast Today
Time magazine, February 24, 1930, article about airshow; no mention of cow
Time magazine, March 3, 1930, article about airshow; no mention of cow

History of aviation
Individual cows
History of Missouri
1930 in aviation
Individual animals in the United States